Clinton Tyler Woods (born January 15, 1869) was an American college football player and coach. He served as the head football coach at Washington & Jefferson College in Washington, Pennsylvania from 1896 to 1897, compiling a record of 18–1–1.

Head coaching record

College

References

1869 births
Year of death missing
Princeton Tigers football players
Washington & Jefferson Presidents football coaches
Wooster Fighting Scots football coaches
High school football coaches in New Jersey